The MLW RSC-14 was a diesel-electric locomotive rebuilt by Canadian National Railway from locomotives originally supplied by Montreal Locomotive Works.

These locomotives began life as MLW RS-18s for the Canadian National Railway (CN). This engine turned a General Electric (of Peterborough, Ontario) DC generator feeding four traction motors - one per axle on two bogies. Many RS-18s were equipped with so-called "light" trucks (made by Dofasco and others) in deference to light rail on Canadian branchlines. RS-18s were owned by Canadian Pacific as well as Canadian National and many other Canadian railways, and continued in service on major railroads into the 1990s. They continue in branchline and secondary service throughout North America today (April 2009).  

Using the RS-18 as a starting point, the RSC-14 was created in the mid-1970s to meet CN's requirement for A1A-A1A trucked locomotives for light rural branchline service, particularly in the Maritimes.

CN retired its older A1A-A1A configured MLW RSC-13 and MLW RSC-24 models in the mid-1970s and rebuilt several dozen RS-18s using the A1A trucks from the scrapped RSC-13 and RSC-24 units.

The locomotives saw extensive use on Prince Edward Island (see Prince Edward Island Railway), and on branch lines in New Brunswick and Nova Scotia.   Most were retired or sold by the mid-1990s.

There are only two of these locomotives left in Canada:
 CN 1754 at the Salem & Hillsborough Railroad
 CN 1762 at the former train station in Kensington, Prince Edward Island

See also 
 List of MLW diesel locomotives

RSC-14
A1A-A1A locomotives
Diesel-electric locomotives of Canada
Canadian National Railway locomotives
Railway locomotives introduced in 1975
Standard gauge locomotives of Canada